Thirumbi Paar is a 1996 Tamil-language comedy drama film directed by Rama Narayanan. The film stars Saravanan and Yuvarani, with Silk Smitha, Manivannan, Vinu Chakravarthy, S. S. Chandran, Nizhalgal Ravi, Chandresekhar and Pandiyan playing supporting roles. It was released on 15 January 1996.

Plot

Avuthu Nayagam (Vinu Chakravarthy) is a wealthy politician who lives with his second wife Vasantha (Silk Smitha). Vasantha is a miser and cunning woman, she buys many properties around her village, she even forces the villagers to sell it to her for low prices. Nayagam's first wife Valliamai (Vadivukkarasi) and son Veeraiyan (Saravanan) live in a small house. Veeraiyan, an ardent fan of actor Rajinikanth, works as a bus conductor and hates Vasantha who brainwashed his father's mind.

One day, Vasantha's assistants : Chokku (Manivannan), Kanakku (S. S. Chandran) and Azhagu (B. Ashokarajan) try to buy a free school owned by the retired military officer Karnal Raja (Nizhalgal Ravi). Karnal Raja refuses to sell it, and he was beaten up by the assistants. Veeraiyan intervenes in time, saves him and his school from the assistants. Frustrated by the incident, Vasantha immediately buys the bus company where Veeraiyan is working, and her brother Ashok (Pandiyan) becomes Veeraiyan's bus company manager. Vasantha hates Veeraiyan more than anything but she is acting to her husband Nayagam as she is Veeraiyan's well-wisher.

A few days later, Karnal Raja is heavily injured by Vasantha's henchmen. Veeraiyan tries to save him, but Karnal Raja died on the way to the hospital. Later, Ashok dismissed Veeraiyan from the bus company, Veeraiyan decides to become a milkman and begins to manage Karnal Raja's school himself. In the meantime, Veeraiyan and Chokku's niece Madhavi (Yuvarani) fall in love with each other. Soon, Vasantha wants her brother to marry her brother Ashok. The conflict between Ashok and Vasantha becomes worst. What transpires next forms the rest of the story.

Cast

Saravanan as Veeraiyan
Yuvarani as Madhavi
Silk Smitha as Vasantha
Manivannan as Chokku
Vinu Chakravarthy as Avuthu Nayagam
S. S. Chandran as Kanakku
Nizhalgal Ravi as Karnal Raja (guest appearance)
Chandresekhar as Appadurai
Pandiyan as Ashok
Vadivukkarasi as Valliamai
B. Ashokarajan as Azhagu
Pasi Narayanan
Master Saravanan
Karuppu Subbiah 
Kullamani
Thillai Rajan
Bangalore Chidambaram
Veerabhadran
Ali

Soundtrack

The film score and the soundtrack were composed by Deva. The soundtrack, released in 1996, features five tracks with lyrics written by Vaali.

Legacy
The film marked the last film appearance of actress Silk Smitha.

References

External links

1996 films
1990s Tamil-language films
Indian comedy-drama films
Films scored by Deva (composer)
Films directed by Rama Narayanan